Georgia Ku (born February 20, 1993) is an English singer and songwriter. She was a featured artist on the 2018 NOTD and Felix Jaehn hit single "So Close". The song has appeared on numerous charts including at number 11 on the Billboard Dance/Electronic Songs chart. Ku has also written songs for numerous notable acts including Martin Garrix, Dua Lipa, Iggy Azalea, Zedd, and others.

Career
Ku got her start in around 2015 as a vocalist and songwriter. That year, she was featured on the Dillon Francis and Skrillex track, "Bun Up The Dance" and the Nicky Romero and Stadiumx song, "Harmony". She also co-wrote several songs including Zedd's "Illusion" featuring Echosmith and Skylar Stecker's "Crazy Beautiful". In 2016, she was featured on the Getter track, "Blood", and appeared on two KNOXA songs, "Bang Bang" and "Something More". She also co-wrote the Fifth Harmony song, "1000 Hands" of their 7/27 album.

Ku's song "Bloodline" was featured on the soundtrack for the 2016 film, The Birth of a Nation. At the end of the year, Ku was featured on the Party Favor single, "In My Head", which reached number 7 on the Billboard Dance/Mix Show Airplay chart. In early 2017, the Martin Garrix and Dua Lipa song "Scared to Be Lonely", which Ku co-wrote, was released. It peaked at number 14 on the UK Singles Chart. That year, Ku also co-wrote Iggy Azalea's "Switch" featuring Anitta.

In 2018, Ku was featured on several tracks, including Captain Cuts and Zookëper's "Do You Think About Me?" and NOTD and Felix Jaehn's "So Close" (which also featured Captain Cuts). The latter song reached number one on both the Dance Club Songs and the Dance/Mix Show Airplay charts. It also reached number 11 on the Billboard Dance/Electronic Songs chart, number 40 on the Mainstream Top 40 chart, and number 20 on the UK Dance Singles chart. 2018 also saw the release of two songs Ku co-wrote: MØ's "Mercy" (featuring What So Not and Two Feet) and Rita Ora's "Soul Survivor".

In 2019, Ku co-wrote the Jai Wolf song, "Still Sleeping", off his album, The Cure to Loneliness.

Ku was a featured artist on the 2018 NOTD and Felix Jaehn single "So Close", with a music video starring Sports Illustrated Swimsuit cover girl Camille Kostek.

Discography

Extended plays

Singles as lead artist

Singles as featured artist

Guest appearances

Songwriting

References

External links
Primary Wave profile

 
1993 births
Living people
Atlantic Records artists
English songwriters
English women pop singers